Philippe Bugalski (12 June 1963 – 10 August 2012) was a French rally driver.

Bugalski became a works Renault driver in the French Rally Championship in 1994. In 1998, he joined the works Citroën team, with whom he won the French national title three years in a row, from 1998 to 2000.

By the mid 1990s he had become a regular choice as tarmac specialist for Citroën, along with team mate Jesús Puras. However, as the Citroën Total World Rally Team entered the World Rally Championship full-time, employing such drivers as Sébastien Loeb, he was frequently entered as Citroën's 3rd driver for tarmac rallies. His top performances were on home soil on the Tour de Corse, but he also showed potential in the Rallye Sanremo, Monte Carlo Rally, and Rallye Catalunya.

In 1999, he won 2 races overall with formula 2 cars.

After his breakthrough, he struggled to secure a firm place in Citroën's WRC team but was always a solid reserve driver and was only really used as a tarmac specialist. By 2003, he had stopped rallying professionally.

Bugalski died on 10 August 2012, aged 49, from injuries sustained when he fell out of a tree at his home in Seine-et-Marne.

WRC victories
{|class="wikitable"
!  # 
! Event
! Season
! Co-driver
! Car
|-
| 1
|  35º Rallye Catalunya-Costa Brava
| 1999
| Jean-Paul Chiaroni
| Citroën Xsara Kit Car
|-
| 2
|  43ème Tour de Corse – Rallye de France
| 1999
| Jean-Paul Chiaroni
| Citroën Xsara|Citroën Xsara Kit Car
|}

Complete WRC results

References

1963 births
2012 deaths
Accidental deaths from falls
Accidental deaths in France
French rally drivers
French people of Polish descent
Sportspeople from Allier
World Rally Championship drivers
Citroën Racing drivers